Phạm Văn Thuần (born 1 November 1992) is a Vietnamese footballer who plays as a midfielder for V.League 2 club Phú Thọ.

Honours

Club
Hà Nội
 V.League 1: 2013; runners-up: 2014
 Vietnamese Super Cup runners-up: 2013
Sài Gòn
 V.League 2: 2015
Nam Định
 V.League 2: 2017

References 

1992 births
Living people
Vietnamese footballers
Association football defenders
V.League 1 players
Hanoi FC players
Becamex Binh Duong FC players